This article lists the largest companies in the United Kingdom in terms of their revenue, net profit and total assets, according to the American business magazines Fortune, Forbes and Global Database.

2022 Fortune list 
This list displays all 18 British companies in the Fortune Global 500, which ranks the world's largest companies by annual revenue. The figures below are given in millions of US dollars and are for the fiscal year 2021. Also listed are the headquarters location, net profit, number of employees worldwide and industry sector of each company.

2021 Global Database list 
This list displays 30 UK companies by annual revenue, this list ranks the world's largest companies by annual revenue. The annual revenue is calculated in billions of GBP Pounds and are for the fiscal year 2021

2022 Forbes list 
This list is based on the Forbes Global 2000, which ranks the world's 2,000 largest publicly traded companies. The Forbes list takes into account a multitude of factors, including the revenue, net profit, total assets and market value of each company; each factor is given a weighted rank in terms of importance when considering the overall ranking. The table below also lists the headquarters location and industry sector of each company. The figures are in billions of US dollars and are for the year 2021. The 50 highest ranked companies from the United Kingdom are listed.

See also 
List of companies of the United Kingdom
List of largest private companies in the United Kingdom
List of largest companies by revenue
List of largest private non-governmental companies by revenue

References 

United Kingdom
companies
Largest

companies